The Elk City Wagon Road-Vicory Gulch-Smith Grade Segment in the Nez Perce National Forest in Idaho County, Idaho, was listed on the National Register of Historic Places in 2001. It is located in the vicinity of Elk City.

The Elk City Wagon Road was a  road built during 1894 to 1895 from Harpster southeast to the mining town of Elk City. It was built mainly along the route of a pack trail, the Southern Nez Perce Trail, which had been established by 1861, but the wagon trail differed in that it included switchbacks up steep sections and included corduroy road through swamps.

References

Roads on the National Register of Historic Places in Idaho
Idaho County, Idaho
Roads in Idaho